The South Vietnam V-League was the top level of football in South Vietnam. It was founded in 1960.

Champions
 1961/62 - Hải Quan
 1963-65 Not Known
 1966 - Hải Quan
 1967 - Cảnh Sát
 1968-1976 Not Known
 1977 - Cảng Sài Gòn
 1978 - Cảng Sài Gòn 
 1979 - Cảng Sài Gòn

References
https://www.rsssf.org/tablesv/vietchamp.html

1966 establishments in Vietnam
Football leagues in Vietnam
Defunct top level football leagues in Asia